The barred antshrike (Thamnophilus doliatus) is a passerine bird in the antbird family. It is found in the Neotropics from Tamaulipas, Mexico, through Central America, Trinidad and Tobago, and a large part of South America east of the Andes as far south as northern Argentina, Bolivia and Paraguay. There is one accepted record from southern Texas. It is found in a wide range of wooded habitats (even gardens and parks) in both humid and arid regions. Throughout a large part of its range, it is among the most common antbirds.

Taxonomy
The barred antshrike was described by the Swedish naturalist Carl Linnaeus in 1764 and given the binomial name Lanius doliatus. The type locality was subsequently designated as Surinam. The specific epithet is from New Latin doliatus meaning "barred". There are 12 recognised subspecies.

Description
This species exhibits marked sexual dimorphism. The male of the nominate race is barred all over with black and white, and has a white-based black crest that is raised in display. The female is rufous above with a chestnut crest. The sides of her head and neck are streaked with black, and the underparts are rich buff. In both sexes, the legs are grey, the bill is black and the iris is pale yellow.

The subspecies vary primarily in the overall darkness and the amount of barring and hue of the underparts. For example, in the Tobagonian race T. d. tobagensis, males are whiter below, and females darker, than in the nominate subspecies. The most distinctive subspecies is T. d. capistratus of the Caatinga in north-eastern Brazil, where males have uniform black crown (no white barring to the base) and females have streaked throat and faintly barred belly. It is also the only subspecies where the iris is deep maroon-red. It has been suggested that it should be considered a separate species, the Caatinga barred antshrike.

Behavior
It is typically found as territorial pairs. The female lays two purple-marked creamy white eggs in a deep cup nest in a shrub, which are incubated by both sexes for 14 days to hatching. The chicks fledge in another 12–13 days.

The barred antshrike is an insectivore which feeds on ants and other arthropods at or near the ground; it sometimes follows columns of army ants, and will take small lizards and berries. It is a skulking species, which may be located by its chuckling hu-hu-hu-hu-hu-hu song, often performed as a duet by a pair of birds, or a growled graaaaa.

Gallery

References

Further reading

External links

 Barred antshike images at www.surinamebirds.nl
 
 
 
 
 

barred antshrike
Birds of Central America
Birds of the Amazon Basin
Birds of Colombia
Birds of Venezuela
Birds of the Guianas
Birds of Brazil
Birds of Bolivia
Birds of Paraguay
Birds of Trinidad and Tobago
Birds of the Pantanal
Birds of the Cerrado
Birds of the Caatinga
barred antshrike
Taxa named by Carl Linnaeus